USS Sellers (DDG-11) was a Charles F. Adams-class guided-missile destroyer built for the United States Navy in the 1950s.

Design and description
The Charles F. Addams class was based on a stretched  hull modified to accommodate smaller RIM-24 Tartar surface-to-air missiles and all their associated equipment. They displaced  at full load. Their crew consisted of 18 officers and 320 enlisted men.

The ships were equipped with two geared steam turbines, each driving one propeller shaft, using steam provided by four water-tube boilers.

The Charles F. Adams-class ships were armed with two 5"/54 caliber Mark 42 guns, one forward and one aft of the superstructure. They were fitted with an eight-round ASROC launcher between the funnels. Close-range anti-submarine defense was provided by two triple sets of  Mk 32 torpedo tubes. The primary armament of the ships was the Tartar surface-to-air missile designed to defend the carrier battle group. They were fired via the dual-arm Mk 11 missile launcher and the ships stowed a total of 42 missiles for the launcher.

Construction and career
Sellers, named for Admiral David F. Sellers, was laid down by the Bath Iron Works at Bath in Maine on 3 August 1959, launched on 9 September 1960 by Mrs. Hugh Scott and commissioned on 28 October 1961. Sellers was decommissioned on 31 October 1989, stricken from the Naval Vessel Register on 20 November 1992 and sold on 25 July 1995.

As of 2005, no other U.S. Navy ship has been named Sellers.

Notes

References

External links
MaritimeQuest USS Sellers DDG-11 pages
USS Sellers Association
 

Cold War destroyers of the United States
1960 ships
Charles F. Adams-class destroyers